is a Japanese copywriter, essayist, lyricist, game designer, and actor. Itoi is the editor-in-chief of his website and company Hobo Nikkan Itoi Shinbun ("Almost Daily Itoi Newspaper"). He is best known outside Japan for his work on Nintendo's Mother/EarthBound series of games, as well as his self-titled bass fishing video game.

Writing
During the 1980s Itoi established the profession of writing copy for advertisements among the general public in Japan. In 1981, he co-authored a collection of short stories titled Yume de Aimashou ("Let's meet in a dream") with writer Haruki Murakami. Later Itoi branched into writing essays, lyrics, and designing video games. He is best known outside of Japan for Nintendo's Earthbound, released in 1994 in Japan (as Mother 2 : Giygas Strikes Back) and in 1995 in North America.

In 1997, Itoi began using the Internet and bought his first Macintosh. In 1998 he started the website and company Hobo Nikkan Itoi Shinbun ("Almost Daily Itoi Newspaper"), which is the center of his activity today. Under the theme of "creating good mood", the website has been updated every day for the past 15 years, with Itoi's essays on lifestyle, interviews and articles, and merchandise sales. He talks about his pet dogs and his interviews with artists, craftsmen, businessmen, etc., which tend to center on philosophical issues. Itoi has co-written several books modeled on these interviews, in which he has a series of long conversations with, for example, an expert on neurology Yūji Ikegaya, about how to live as a human being in the world. Books collecting Itoi's past essays written on the site's front page are also available for purchase.

Filmography
Itoi has voiced Satsuki's father, Tatsuo Kusakabe, in the original Japanese version of the 1988 Studio Ghibli film My Neighbor Totoro. He has been a judge on several episodes of the Japanese television shows Iron Chef and Hey! Spring of Trivia. He made his acting debut in 2010, when he played the role of a professor in the film adaptation of Haruki Murakami's Norwegian Wood.

Video games
Itoi established the company Ape, Inc. as a venue for external developers to help make games for Nintendo. He was the creator of the Mother series. In the original Mother for the Famicom, he was lead designer, writer and director; on EarthBound for the SNES, Itoi was producer, director and writer while in Mother 3 for Game Boy Advance, Itoi was the writer of the story. Itoi was involved in the pet simulator video game Cabbage, which was canceled after years in development hell.

Itoi claims that the final battle of EarthBound with Giygas was inspired from his accidental childhood viewing of the Shintoho film titled The Military Policeman and the Dismembered Beauty. Specifically, the scene that inspired the battle was a scene depicting a woman being murdered, which he mistook for rape.

Itoi has said that he would not be involved in a fourth title of the series. Itoi's works have had an impact on other games and other media, including Undertale, Lisa: The Painful RPG, and others.

Other ventures 

Shigesato Itoi worked with Nintendo to design video game-themed haramaki.

He also competed in the 1992 Monopoly World Championships and placed eighth. Itoi's video game development company Ape, Inc. developed two Monopoly games for the Super Famicom, with Itoi serving as producer. These versions of Monopoly were not released outside of Japan and featured a more role-playing experience.

Itoi launched a photo creation tool called "Dokonoko", which is designed specifically to be used with pets. It has been described as an "Instagram for pets".  Dokonoko is most famous for a particular Japanese Labrador Retriever named Corky, who made front line news because of the abnormal length of her tongue.

Personal life 
Itoi was born on November 10, 1948, and raised in Maebashi, Gunma. He was a heavy smoker until he quit in 2002. Itoi has been married to actress Kanako Higuchi since 1993.

References

External links
 
 
 
 
 Shigesato Itoi at NHK Archives 
 Shigesato Itoi profile at MobyGames
 Shigesato Itoi manga at Media Arts Database 
 Shigesato Itoi anime at Media Arts Database 
 Super Mario 25th Anniversary Itoi discusses Mario Bros. with its creator Shigeru Miyamoto
 Johnny Weir!!! Itoi interviews US Olympic figure skater Johnny Weir
 Special Selection: Shigesato Itoi 

1948 births
Japanese copywriters
Japanese essayists
Japanese male short story writers
Japanese male voice actors
Japanese video game directors
Living people
Mother (video game series)
Nintendo people
People from Maebashi